David Southby (born 1965), is a male former judoka who competed for England.

Judo career
Southby represented England and won a gold medal in the 78 kg half-middleweight category, at the 1990 Commonwealth Games in Auckland, New Zealand.

References

1965 births
English male judoka
Commonwealth Games medallists in judo
Commonwealth Games gold medallists for England
Judoka at the 1990 Commonwealth Games
Living people
Medallists at the 1990 Commonwealth Games